Asir Intesar (born 25 August 1994) is a Bangladeshi cricketer. He made his List A debut for Kala Bagan Krira Chakra in the 2017–18 Dhaka Premier Division Cricket League on 29 March 2018.

References

External links
 

1994 births
Living people
Bangladeshi cricketers
Kala Bagan Krira Chakra cricketers
Place of birth missing (living people)